Yevgeni Dadonov (born August 7, 1992) is a Belarusian ice hockey player. He is currently playing with HK Neman Grodno of the Belarusian Extraleague (BXL).

Dadonov made his Kontinental Hockey League (KHL) debut playing with HC Dinamo Minsk during the 2013–14 KHL season.

He has also spent multiple seasons with HC Shakhtyor Soligorsk of the BXL.

References

External links

1992 births
Living people
HC Dinamo Minsk players
Belarusian ice hockey left wingers